The Sign of the City is a 2007 Brazilian drama film directed by Carlos Alberto Riccelli and written by Bruna Lombardi, who also plays the main character.

Plot
Gil (Malvino Salvador) is married, but is lonely. Lydia (Denise Fraga) likes to take chances. Josialdo (Sidney Santiago) was born to be a woman. Monica (Graziella Moretto) is a Gold Digger and just wants to get along. Everybody listens to the radio night program of the astrologer Teca (Bruna Lombardi), which deals with the aspirations of its listeners and her own problems.

Cast

Bruna Lombardi as Teca
Malvino Salvador as Gil
Juca de Oliveira as Aníbal
Graziela Moretto as Mônica
Luís Miranda as Sombra
Denise Fraga as Lydia
Eva Wilma as Adélia
Fernando Alves Pinto as Devanir
Sidney Santiago as Josi
Kim Riccelli as Gabriel
Laís Marques as Júlia
Bethito Tavares as Biô
Thiago Pinheiro as Luís
Rogério Brito as Oriovaldo
Cristina Mutarelli as Hilda

References

External links
 

Brazilian drama films
2007 drama films
Films shot in São Paulo
Films set in São Paulo
Brazilian LGBT-related films
LGBT-related drama films
2007 LGBT-related films
2007 films